Eméric Kpegba (born 29 May 1999) is a Togolese swimmer. He competed in the men's 50 metre freestyle event at the 2016 Summer Olympics, where he ranked 80th with a time of 27.67 seconds. He did not advance to the semifinals. In 2019, he represented Togo at the 2019 African Games held in Rabat, Morocco.

References

1999 births
Living people
Togolese male swimmers
Olympic swimmers of Togo
Swimmers at the 2016 Summer Olympics
Place of birth missing (living people)
African Games competitors for Togo
Swimmers at the 2015 African Games
Swimmers at the 2019 African Games
21st-century Togolese people